The Roman Catholic Diocese of Galway, Kilmacduagh and Kilfenora is a Roman Catholic diocese in the west of Ireland. It is in the ecclesiastical province of Tuam and is subject to the Metropolitan Archdiocese of Tuam. The deanery of Kilfenora, previously a diocese in its own right, lies in the ecclesiastical province of Cashel. The ordinary is Bishop Michael Duignan who was appointed on 11 February 2022.

Geographic remit
The geographic remit of the see includes the City of Galway, parts of the county of Galway and the northern coastal part of County Clare. Large population centres include Ennistymon, Oranmore and Oughterard. The cathedral church of the diocese is the Cathedral of Our Lady Assumed into Heaven and St Nicholas.

Ecclesiastical history
The diocese has its origins in the ancient monastery of Kilmacduagh and the Wardenship of Galway (1484–1831). Following the abolition of the Wardenship (see Edmund Ffrench) by the Holy See in 1831, the first Bishop of the new Diocese of Galway was appointed in the same year.

In 1866, Bishop John McEvilly of Galway was made Apostolic Administrator of the diocese of Kilmacduagh and Kilfenora. When he was appointed coadjutor to the Archdiocese of Tuam in 1878, he retained Galway until he succeeded as archbishop in 1881. McEvilly continued to oversee Kilmacduagh and Kilfenora until 1883 when Pope Leo XIII united the diocese with the neighbouring Diocese of Kilmacduagh. At the same time, the ordinary of the United Diocese of Galway and  Kilmacduagh was appointed, in perpetuum, as the Apostolic Administrator of the Diocese of Kilfenora.

The bishopric of Kilmacduagh had been a separate title until 1750 when Pope Benedict XIV decreed that it to be united with the bishopric of Kilfenora. Since Kilmacduagh was in the Ecclesiastical province of Tuam while Kilfenora was in the Province of Cashel, it was arranged that the ordinary of the united dioceses was to be alternately bishop of one diocese and apostolic administrator of the other. The first holder of this unusual arrangement was Peter Kilkelly, who had been Bishop of Kilmacduagh since 1744, became Apostolic Administrator of Kilfenora in September 1750. Since that date, Kilfenora has been administered by that united diocese as an Apostolic Vicariate.  Since the territory of an Apostolic Vicariate comes directly under the pope as "universal bishop", the pope exercises his authority in Kilfenora through a "vicar".

In 2021 the Holy See announced that the Diocese of Galway, Kilmacduagh and Kilfenora would soon have the same bishop as the Roman Catholic Diocese of Clonfert. This was accomplished on 11 February 2022 with the appointment of Michael Duignan, Bishop of Clonfert, to the Diocese of Galway as well.

Deaneries and Parishes
The united diocese is divided into five deaneries for which a Vicar Forane (VF) is appointed by the bishop. The VF exercises limited jurisdiction in the deanery on behalf of the bishop. The deaneries are divided further into parishes or group parishes.

 Deanery of Galway City East – Parishes: Ballybane Ballinfoyle Cathedral Good Shepherd Mervue Renmore Saint Augustine Saint Francis Saint Patrick.
 Deanery of Galway City West – Parishes: Knocknacarra Sacred Heart Salthill Saint Joseph Saint Mary, Claddagh.
 Deanery of Galway Rural – Parishes: An Spidéal Barna Castlegar Killanin Leitirmóir Moycullen Oranmore Oughterard Rosmuc Shrule.
 Deanery of Kilmacduagh – Parishes: Ardrahan Ballinderreen Clarinbridge Craughwell Gort & Beagh Kilbeacanty & Peterswell Kilchreest & Castledaly Kinvara.
 Deanery of Kilfenora – Parishes: Ballyvaughan Carron & New Quay Ennistymon Kilfenora Liscannor & Moymore Lisdoonvarna & Kilshanny.

List of Bishops

Bishops of Galway

Bishops of Galway and Kilmacduagh
and Apostolic Administrators of Kilfenora

See also
 Catholic Church in Ireland

References

External links
 GalwayDiocese.ie Official Diocesan Website
 Diocese of Galway and Kilmacduagh (GCatholic website)
 Diocese of Cill Fhionnúrach (i.e Kilfenora) (GCatholic website)
 Diocese of Galway and Kilmacduagh (Catholic-Hierarchy website)
 Diocese of Kilfenora (Catholic-Hierarchy website)
 

 
Religion in County Galway
Religious organizations established in 1883
Galway, Kilmacduagh and Kilfenora
1883 establishments in Ireland